Henry Hope Reed Jr. (September 25, 1915 – May 1, 2013) was an American architecture critic known for his advocacy of classical architecture and his outspoken criticism of modernist architecture.

Life
Born in Manhattan, Reed earned a degree in history from Harvard College in 1938. He also studied decorative arts at the École du Louvre in Paris.  In 1952, he published his first work critical of modernism, a point of view he held until his death.

Reed lectured in the Department of Urban Planning at the University of Yale, made research on architecture and urbanism, gave walking tours of Manhattan’s historic architecture and neighborhoods, and published the book The Golden City in 1959.

Following several books advocating preservation of classical architecture in New York City, Reed was named curator of Central Park in 1966, thus becoming the first curator of NYC parks.

Reed co-founded Classical America, an organization committed to a resurgence of classical design, urbanism and architecture. It merged with The Institute of Classical Architecture in 2002.

The Henry Hope Reed Award was established in 2005, named in honor of Reed's legacy. It is awarded by the Notre Dame School of Architecture and sponsored by the Richard Driehaus Foundation. The prize is given to an individual working outside the practice of architecture who has supported the cultivation of the traditional city, its architecture and art through writing, planning or promotion. It is awarded in conjunction with the Driehaus Architecture Prize.

Reed died on May 1, 2013 at his home in Manhattan. He was 97. Reed's wife, the former Constance Culbertson Feeley, died in 2007. He left no immediate survivors.

Works
Reed authored multiple books, including:
The Golden City, 1959
American Skyline, with Christopher Tunnard
Central Park: A History and a Guide, with Sophia Duckworth
The Library of Congress, with John Y. Cole
The New York Public Library, with Francis Morrone
Classical America Series in Art and Architecture, co-editor
The United States Capitol: Its Architecture and Decoration
The U.S. Capitol: Its Lesson for Today

References

External links
Francis Morrone, "How Henry Hope Reed Saved Architecture"
Henry Hope Reed, inaugural prize introduction for the Henry Hope Reed Award in 2005 at Notre Dame School of Architecture
Henry Hope Reed, Jr.'s obituary
 Henry Hope Reed papers, 1911-1998 Held in the Dept. of Drawings & Archives, Avery Architectural & Fine Arts Library, Columbia University, New York City

Harvard College alumni
1915 births
2013 deaths
People from Manhattan
American architecture writers
American male non-fiction writers
New Classical architecture